Doug Hansen may refer to:
 Doug Hansen (baseball) (1928–1998), American baseball player
 Doug Hansen (luger) (born 1948), Canadian luger
 Doug Hansen, 1990 Peace and Freedom candidate in California's 43rd congressional district
 Doug Hansen, mailman and amateur mountain climber who died in the 1996 Mount Everest disaster
 Doug Hansen, chief technical officer of M-DISC